Kozlova is a rural locality (a village) in Yorgvinskoye Rural Settlement, Kudymkarsky District, Perm Krai, Russia. The population was 113 as of 2010.

Geography 
It is located 15 km north-east from Kudymkar.

References 

Rural localities in Kudymkarsky District